Team Love is an independent record label based in New Paltz, New York, founded by Conor Oberst and Nate Krenkel in 2003. It has released albums by several other recording artists. Team Love also released the documentary film by Roy Germano, The Other Side of Immigration.  A distinguishing marketing tactic of Team Love has been complete albums for download in unprotected mp3 format at no cost on their website in addition to traditional record and CD sales. This practice evolved into what is now known as The Team Love Library.

History

Formation
The label was founded in 2003 in part due to Oberst's frustration at not being able to sign and showcase talent quickly enough through the record label on which his own Bright Eyes albums are released, Saddle Creek Records. Saddle Creek was a label his brother helped co-found but was operated and managed by various individuals. Team Love, while once distributed through Saddle Creek, is now distributed directly through Alternative Distribution Alliance.

Early years
Team Love's first release was Tilly and the Wall's Wild Like Children on June 22, 2004. In 2006, Team Love released Jenny Lewis' solo debut with The Watson Twins and later the Tilly and the Wall follow-up Bottoms of Barrels.  The year before, it put out records by David Dondero and Craig Wedren as well as the Bright Eyes live album Motion Sickness (though the band's studio albums are still released through the Saddle Creek imprint). Team Love reissued Park Ave.'s When Jamie Went to London... We Broke Up in late 2005. The album was produced on Urinine Records in 1999, but in 2005 Urinine closed, making the album out of print.

Later years
In later years, Team Love released Candylion by Super Furry Animals', frontman Gruff Rhys, a live album by art-rock band Shudder To Think, and a remix EP for the Tilly and the Wall single Love Riot, taken from the band's 4th studio album Heavy Mood (2012) which included remixes by Cycad and Distal.

Relocation (2009)
In 2009, Team Love moved from the East Village of Manhattan (13th Street, or "Sugar Street") to 11 Church Street in New Paltz NY.  The label opened a public space called the Team Love Ravenhouse Gallery (a partnership with Ravenhouse Management) which serves as an art gallery, record store and physical space for music and art fans. The Gallery (TL-RH.com) is open weekends and by appointment.

In 2012 the label released the four band compilation album Die Pfalz which featured local artists from the Hudson Valley including Breakfast In Fur, Shana Falana, Bloodletters and electronic artist Cycad.

Also notably, Krenkel was a former A&R representative for 8 years with Sony/ATV Publishing before leaving to manage Conor Oberst and start Team Love. He was responsible for signing singer/songwriter Jesse Harris to Sony ATV Music Publishing, who was the main songwriter for Norah Jones' debut album Come Away with Me, winning a Grammy for Song of the Year for her first hit Don't Know Why. In 2012 Krenkel acquired Full ownership of Team Love.

Artists

A Weather
Andrea Tomasi 
Arranged Marriage (band)
The Banddroidz
bentcousin
The Berg Sans Nipple
Billy Stoner
Bright Eyes
Broderick & Broderick
Capgun Coup
Choir Boy (band)
Conduits (band)
Conor Oberst & The Mystic Valley Band
Craig Wedren
David Dondero
El Madmo
The Felice Brothers
Flowers Forever
Good Good Blood
Guilt Mountain
Gruff Rhys
High Up (band)
Iji (band)
InDreama
Jason Boesel
Jemima James
Jenny Lewis with the Watson Twins
Johanna Warren
Joker's Daughter
Last Good Tooth
Long Beard (band)
The Lowest Pair
Mars Black
McCarthy Trenching
Midnight Masses (band)
MiWi La Lupa
Nik Freitas
El Madmo
Park Ave. (band)
Popup
QUARTERBACKS (band)
Refried Ice Cream
Roger Lion
Rig 1
Roy Germano
Roz and The Ricecakes
Saul Conrad
SDX (band)
Sea of Bees
Shana Falana
Shudder To Think
Simon Joyner
Simone Felice
Tilly and the Wall
The Lowest Pair
The Wave Pictures

Former artists
 Willy Mason (later moved to Astralwerks)

See also 
 List of record labels
 Saddle Creek Records

References

Business Week Interview: Team Love: Downloads Sell CDs
Business Week Article: Kissing Off The Big Music Labels
Stop Smiling Label Profile: Team Love Records

External links

Alternative rock record labels
American independent record labels
Companies based in New York City
Conor Oberst
Record labels established in 2003